Cabañas is a village and consejo popular of the municipality of Mariel, in the Artemisa Province, on the northeast coast in western Cuba.

History
Prior to 1970 was a municipality  of Pinar del Río Province. Cabañas bay is a harbor with industrial and fishing facilities, with an important base of the Cuban Navy.

From November  to December 1958, the town was the site of a massacre by anti-communist forces during the Cuban Revolution. Authorities began by killing two farmers who they thought were connected to an earlier guerilla attack on Government bases. The soldiers are reported to have killed dozens of suspected communists and witnesses until December. The Havana Times recorded the names of twelve people who died during the massacre.

Geography
Located in the western corner of the Cabañas Bay (Bahía de Cabañas), by the Atlantic Ocean, Cabañas lies between Mariel (21 km west) and Bahía Honda (30 km east), and is crossed in the middle by the state highway "Circuito Norte" (CN). It is 26 km from Guanajay, 34 from Artemisa and 67 from Havana city center.

See also
Municipalities of Cuba
List of cities in Cuba

References

External links

Populated places in Artemisa Province